Turan Güneş (1922–1982) was a Turkish academic and politician who served as the minister of foreign affairs and deputy prime minister in the 1970s. He started his political career in the Democrat Party, but soon he joined the Republican People's Party.

Early life and education
Güneş was born in Kandıra, Kocaeli, in 1922. He graduated from Galatasaray High School. He received a bachelor's degree in law from Istanbul University and also, obtained his PhD in political science from the University of Paris. In 1947 he joined the Democrat Party.

Career
Following his graduation Güneş began to work at the law faculty of Istanbul University and became an associate professor in 1954. The same year he ran for a seat from Kocaeli and won the election becoming a member of the parliament for the Democrat Party. However, he was expelled from the party along with others in 1955. Then he contributed to the establishment of another political party, Liberty Party, which joined the Republican People's Party in 1958. Güneş also became a member of the Republican People's Party in 1959.

Following the military coup 1960 he was elected to the parliament and was one of the members of the commission which drafted a new constitution. From 1961 to 1972 Güneş taught at the Ankara University's faculty of political sciences, and became a professor of administrative law in 1965. He served as the deputy general secretary of the Republican People's Party in the period 1969–1972. He won a seat from Kocaeli in the general elections in 1973. The same year he also ran for the secretary general of the Republican People's Party along with Orhan Eyüpoğlu and Deniz Baykal. He and Baykal lost the election, and Eyüpoğlu became the secretary general of the party.

Güneş was appointed minister of foreign affairs in 1974 in the coalition cabinet led by Prime Minister Bülent Ecevit. Although his term was short, it witnessed a significant event, namely Turkey's military intervention in Cyprus. Güneş was again elected to the parliament in the general elections in 1977 and was named as the deputy prime minister in the cabinet headed by Bülent Ecevit.

Personal life and death
Güneş was married to Nermin Güneş who was a French language teacher. She died in Ankara on 28 July 2021 at age 95. They had two children: Ayşe and Hurşit Güneş who are both academics.

Turan Güneş died in Çanakkale on 9 April 1982 due to cardiac arrest while travelling from Istanbul to Izmir on a ship. He was buried in Zincirlikuyu Cemetery in Istanbul.

References

External links

1922 births
1982 deaths
Galatasaray High School alumni
Academic staff of Ankara University
Istanbul University Faculty of Law alumni
Academic staff of Istanbul University
Ministers of Foreign Affairs of Turkey
People from İzmit
Republican People's Party (Turkey) politicians
Deputy Prime Ministers of Turkey
Members of the 10th Parliament of Turkey
Members of the 15th Parliament of Turkey
Members of the 16th Parliament of Turkey
University of Paris alumni
Members of the 37th government of Turkey
Members of the 40th government of Turkey
Deputies of Kocaeli
Burials at Zincirlikuyu Cemetery